Dingyuan County is a county of Anhui Province, China. It is under the administration of Chuzhou city.

History

The ancestral home of Li Keqiang, the Premier of the People's Republic of China, was Dingyuan.

In December 2011, Taiwanese businessman Zhang Jiulin held a press conference in which he described unfair treatment at the hands of local officials in Dingyuan County in a dispute about embezzlement at a company his father had owned  which lead to Zhang Jiulin serving seven months in jail.

Administrative Divisions

Dingyuan County is divided into 16 towns, 5 townships, 1 ethnic township and 3 others.
16 Towns

5 Townships

1 Ethnic Township
 Hui Erlong

3 Others
 Dingyuan Economic and Technological Development Zone
 Dingyuan Salt Chemical Industrial Park
 Lingjiahu Farm

Climate

References

 
Chuzhou